In differential geometry, Santaló's formula describes how to integrate a function on the unit sphere bundle of a Riemannian manifold by first integrating along every geodesic separately and then 
over the space of all geodesics. It is a standard tool in integral geometry and has applications in isoperimetric and rigidity results. The formula is named after Luis Santaló, who first proved the result in 1952.

Formulation 

Let  be a compact, oriented Riemannian manifold with boundary. Then for a function , Santaló's formula takes the form

where

Validity 
Under the assumptions that 
  is non-trapping (i.e.  for all ) and 
  is strictly convex (i.e. the second fundamental form  is positive definite for every ), 
Santaló's formula is valid for all . In this case it is equivalent to the following identity of measures:

In particular
this implies that the geodesic X-ray transform   extends to a bounded linear map , where  and thus there is the following, -version of Santaló's formula:

In this case Santaló's formula only remains true for functions with support disjoint from this exceptional set .

Proof 
The following proof is taken from [, Lemma 3.3], adapted to the (simpler) setting when conditions 1) and 2) from above are true. Santaló's formula follows from the following two ingredients, noting that  has measure zero.
 An integration by parts formula for the geodesic vector field :

 The construction of a resolvent for the transport equation :

For the integration by parts formula, recall that  leaves the Liouville-measure  invariant and hence , the divergence with respect to the Sasaki-metric .

References 

Differential geometry
Mathematical concepts
Integrals
Riemannian geometry